Parasphaerion granulosum is a species of beetle in the family Cerambycidae, the only species in the genus Parasphaerion.

References

Elaphidiini